The St. Michael's Church is a medieval Byzantine church outside the Kalaja district on a hilltop of the city of Berat of Southern Albania. As part of the Historic Centres of Berat and Gjirokastër UNESCO World Heritage Site, the church was possibly constructed in the fourteenth century and is dedicated to the Christian archangel of Michael. 
 
The church is relative small in size and was constructed on the south of the Kalaja district on a steep rock. It is a cruciform chapel instilled without any internal support, with a dome on drum and narthex on the west section. It was built on a cruciform plan with a dome on the top. The walls are characterized by combination of rows of red brick with stone.

Inside the temple, the remains of painting walls retains only few trace. A collection of frescoes and icons have been preserved nowadays.

See also 

 Tourist attractions in Berat
 Culture of Albania
 Architecture of Albania
 Byzantine churches in Albania

References 

14th-century churches
Cultural Monuments of Albania
Churches in Berat
Tourist attractions in Berat
Byzantine church buildings in Albania
Eastern Orthodox church buildings in Albania
Medieval churches in Albania